Vision sensor may refer to:

 A camera with an imager chip
 Smart or intelligent vision sensor, a combination of digital camera with a processing unit
 Dynamic vision sensor, a neuromorphic digital camera, which responds to local changes in brightness